Brinkley is the most populous city in Monroe County, Arkansas, United States. As of the 2020 census, the population was 2,700, down from 3,188 in 2010.

Located within the Arkansas Delta, Brinkley was founded as a railroad town in 1872. The city has historically been a transportation and agricultural center in the region, more recently developing a reputation for outdoors recreation and the ivory-billed woodpecker. Birding has become important to the city and region following the purported discovery of the ivory-billed woodpecker in 2004, a species thought to be extinct 60 years earlier.

Located halfway between Little Rock and Memphis, the city has used the slogan "We'll Meet You Half-Way" in some of its advertising campaigns.

History
In 1852, a land grant for the construction of rail lines was given to the Little Rock and Memphis Railroad Company, led by its president Robert Campbell Brinkley. Born in North Carolina, Brinkley lived in Memphis, where he served a public career of "noble deeds and generous conduct" and for many years served as president of Planters Bank.

Between 1852 and 1869, the settlement was called "Lick Skillet". When the day's work was completed, the railroad construction crew, mostly all immigrants from neighboring towns, cooked their supper over an open fire and returned to their homes when the last "skillet was licked".

The construction of the rail lines between Little Rock and Memphis brought the city of Brinkley into being. Brinkley is situated in the northern part of Monroe County, the halfway point between the two larger cities. It was laid out in the winter of 1869 on lands belonging to the railroad.

A petition request was granted to incorporate Brinkley on August 6, 1872, at which time the town had 50 qualified voters. The original charter was filed with the Arkansas Secretary of State on August 21, 1872. The Cotton Plant Railroad (later called the Batesville and Brinkley Railroad and the White and Black River Valley Railway) originated from the town in 1879, and the Texas and St. Louis Railway was built through Brinkley in 1883.  

On March 8, 1909, much of the town was destroyed by a violent F4 tornado, which resulted in 49 deaths. Entire families were lost to the tornado, and approximately 800 buildings in the community were destroyed. The tornado was 2/3 of a mile wide.

Duck hunting is a major source of income for the city during the months of November, December and January. With many rice fields flooded for the winter, and being located on the Mississippi Flyway, ducks are very prevalent throughout the region. Men and women from around the United States come to Brinkley for guided hunts throughout the season.

Geography
U.S. Routes 70 and 49 join in the city as Main Street, with US 70 turning east on Cypress Street in the center of town. The Brinkley city limits extend north along US 49 to its interchange with Interstate 40, which connects Memphis and Little Rock.
 

Climate
The climate in this area is characterized by hot, humid summers and generally mild to cool winters.  According to the Köppen Climate Classification system, Brinkley has a humid subtropical climate, abbreviated "Cfa" on climate maps.

Demographics

2020 Census

As of the 2020 United States Census, there were 2,700 people, 1,179 households, and 759 families residing in the city.

2000 Census
As of the census of 2000, there were 3,940 people, 1,543 households, and 972 families residing in the city. The racial makeup of the city was 49.09% White, 49.05% Black or African American, 0.18% Native American, 0.30% Asian, 0.05% Pacific Islander, 0.30% from other races, and 1.62% from two or more races. 1.12% of the population were Hispanic or Latino of any race.

There were 1,543 households, out of which 31.8% had children under the age of 18 living with them, 39.5% were married couples living together, 20.8% had a female householder with no husband present, and 37.0% were non-families. 33.7% of all households were made up of individuals, and 15.8% had someone living alone who was 65 years of age or older. The average household size was 2.48 and the average family size was 3.23.

In the city, the population was spread out, with 31.0% under the age of 18, 8.4% from 18 to 24, 22.4% from 25 to 44, 20.7% from 45 to 64, and 17.4% who were 65 years of age or older. The median age was 36 years. For every 100 females, there were 81.5 males. For every 100 females age 18 and over, there were 73.5 males.

The median income for a household in the city was $19,868, and the median income for a family was $27,820. Males had a median income of $26,117 versus $16,714 for females. The per capita income for the city was $12,441. About 23.8% of families and 30.9% of the population were below the poverty line, including 38.6% of those under age 18 and 18.7% of those age 65 or over.

Arts and culture

Tourism

Brinkley has attempted to capitalize on its good fortune of being the largest city near the refuge and the rediscovery of the woodpecker:
 A billboard on eastbound Interstate 40 proclaims Brinkley as "The Home of the Ivory-Billed Woodpecker".
 One motel has changed its name to "The Ivory-Billed Inn".
 A local resident has opened a shop, "The Ivory-Billed Nest", devoted exclusively to ivory-billed paraphernalia.
 One local barbershop offers an "ivory-billed" haircut (a variation of the mohawk complete with red tinting).
 Gene's Restaurant and Barbecue, a popular local restaurant, offers an "ivory-billed burger" and an "ivory-billed salad" on its menu; in addition, two of the initial rediscoverers of the ivory-billed woodpecker have written a children's book which mentions Gene's.

In addition to the ivory-billed sightings, since July 2005 at least two confirmed reports of bald eagle nests have been found in the Monroe County area. Further, the swamps of the Cache River are believed to contain among the oldest cypress trees in the United States.

Brinkley opened a convention center in 1996 which can seat up to 600 people; in February 2006 the center hosted a conference commemorating the second anniversary of the ivory-billed woodpecker's rediscovery.

Education 

Public education for elementary and secondary school students is provided by the Brinkley School District, which leads to graduation from Brinkley High School.

Infrastructure

Transportation

From its ties to the transportation industry, the city of Brinkley continues to maintain a position at the center of major transportation arteries. Brinkley is located in Monroe County in the rich relics from the past and rolling farmlands of the Arkansas Delta. The halfway point between Little Rock and Memphis, it is a convenient oasis for travelers along Interstate 40 (I-40), one of the busiest interstates in the United States. The city is also located on U.S. Route 49 (US 49), providing transit north-south, and US 70, an additional east-west corridor.

Notable people
 Dorathy M. Allen, the first woman elected to the Arkansas Senate
 Al Bell, record producer, songwriter, and record executive
 Curtis Burrow, former member of the Green Bay Packers
 Jerry Eckwood, former Arkansas Razorbacks football player and member of the Tampa Bay Buccaneers.
 John Handcox, Great Depression-era tenant farmer and union advocate renowned for his politically charged songs and poetry
 Betty Cooper Hearnes, Missouri state representative
 Louis Jordan, born in Brinkley, jazz and early rock & roll musician inducted in the Rock and Roll Hall of Fame
 Herbert "Flight Time" Lang, current member of the Harlem Globetrotters basketball team and three-time participant in The Amazing Race
 Tommy Robinson, former Pulaski County sheriff, 2nd District congressman, and gubernatorial candidate

See also
 Gazzola and Vaccaro Building
 St. John the Baptist Catholic Church (Brinkley, Arkansas)

References

External links

 
 National Public Radio, "Brinkley, Ark., Embraces 'The Lord God Bird'", song about Brinkley by Sufjan Stevens; All Things Considered, July 6, 2005

1852 establishments in Arkansas
Cities in Arkansas
Cities in Monroe County, Arkansas
Populated places established in 1852